Strategic Seduction is a romance novel by Cheris Hodges, published in 2018 by Dafina Books.

The book received a generally positive reception, receiving reviews from publications including Kirkus Reviews, Publishers Weekly, and Bookish.

References 

2018 American novels
American romance novels
Contemporary romance novels